Statistics of Swiss Super League in the 1916–17 season.

East

Table

Central

Table

West

Table

Final

Table

Results 

|colspan="3" style="background-color:#D0D0D0" align=center|3 June 1917

|-
|colspan="3" style="background-color:#D0D0D0" align=center|17 June 1917

|-
|colspan="3" style="background-color:#D0D0D0" align=center|21 June 1917

|}

FC Winterthur won the championship.

Sources 
 Switzerland 1916-17 at RSSSF

Seasons in Swiss football
Swiss Football League seasons
1916–17 in Swiss football
Swiss